The White Ribbon Cup was a knockout cup competition in New Zealand association football. The knockout competition was run by New Zealand Football with the 2011–12 season being both the inaugural and only season of the Cup.

The knockout competition was established in 2011 to provide regular football for the six clubs not participating in the Oceania Champions League (OFC) and runs in conjunction with the ASB Premiership regular season.

Format
The six competing teams were split into two conferences – a Northern and Southern Conference. Each team played two conferences games as a round-robin table format, with the league winner progressing to the national final against the opposing conference winner.

Clubs

References

External links
White Ribbon Cup website
White Ribbon Cup on Ultimate New Zealand Soccer Website

Association football cup competitions in New Zealand